L'amore è femmina is the second studio album by Italian recording artist Nina Zilli, released in Italy on 15 February 2012, following her participation in the 62nd Sanremo Music Festival with the song "Per sempre", chosen as the lead single from the album. The second single and title track,"L'amore è femmina", was chosen as the official song entry for Italy at the Eurovision Song Contest 2012, which was held in Baku, Azerbaijan.

In November 2012 the album was certified gold by the Federation of the Italian Music Industry for domestic sales exceeding 30,000 units.

Track listing

Personnel
Credits for L'amore è femmina adapted from the album liner notes.

Music credits
 Biagio Antonacci - drums
 Alberto Boliettieri - trombone, bass trombone
 Gareth Brown - drums
 Simone D'Eusanio - strings
 Riccardo Jeeba Gibertini - trumpet, French horn
 Christian "Noochie" Rigano - piano, Fender Rhodes, ARP, solina, Hammond organ, synth, string arrangements
 Davide Tagliapietra - drums, bass, guitars, string arrangements
 Marco Zaghi - tenor sax, flutes
 Nina Zilli - voice, string arrangements

Production
 Michele Canova - producer
 Fabrizio Giannini - executive producer
 Davide Tagliapietra - producer, arrangements
 Pino "Pinaxa" Pischetola - producer, arrangements, mixing
 Nina Zilli - producer, arrangements
 Patrizio "Pat" Simonini - assistant
 Antonio Baglio - mastering

Charts

Weekly charts

Year-end charts

Notes

2012 albums
Italian-language albums
Nina Zilli albums
Albums produced by Michele Canova